Ljubanci is a neighbourhood in the city of Skopje, North Macedonia and part of the municipality of Čair, North Macedonia.

Demographics
According to the 2021 census, the village had a total of 1.075 inhabitants. Ethnic groups in the village include:

Macedonians 981
Persons for whom data are taken from administrative sources 71
Turks 2
Serbs 8
Romani 10
Vlachs 1
Others 2

Sports
Local football club FK Ljubanci 1974 have played in the Macedonian Second League.

References

Villages in Butel Municipality